Terrina Chrishell Stause (born July 21, 1981) is an American actress. She is known for her role on the Netflix reality show Selling Sunset, along with previous television roles as Amanda Dillon on All My Children and Jordan Ridgeway on Days of Our Lives.

Early life 
Stause was born in Draffenville, Kentucky. She attended Murray State University, from which she received her B.A. in theater in 2003. Her middle name "Chrishell” is a portmanteau word created based on the unusual circumstances  of her birth: her mother went into labor at a Shell station, and  an attendant named Chris helped deliver the baby. However, in her book Stause denies the gossip on her birth. She mentioned that her mother had some car troubles and pulled into a gas station. While waiting at the car station, she went into pre-labor and the car attendant genuinely helped her to reach a hospital. Stause was born in a hospital. Before knowing that she was pregnant, her mother broke up with her biological  father, who was half Japanese and half Spanish. Jeff is her stepfather. 
Stause missed a full year of middle school because she was forced to live in a tent. At that time, Stause mentioned washing her hair in the river, using food stamps and hiding her life from classmates. Her parents "struggled with addiction and mental health" and for a period joined the Worldwide Church of God when she was 10 years old. Her mother never had a steady job and Stause describes her as free spirit and self-righteous.

Career 
Stause is known for her portrayal of Amanda Dillon in the ABC soap opera All My Children, a role she began on May 4, 2005, when the character returned to Pine Valley after a five-year absence. The role of Amanda was previously portrayed by Alexis Manta. The soap was cancelled and ended on September 23, 2011, and later Stause guest starred in  the second season of the Dana Delany series Body of Proof. She was a member of improvisational troupe The Groundlings in Los Angeles.

In April 2013, it was announced that Stause had joined the cast of NBC soap Days of Our Lives. Her character, Jordan Ridgeway, first appeared in Salem on August 15, 2013. On October 24, 2014, it was announced that Stause would be leaving the series in 2015. In 2018, it was announced that Stause was reprising the role and would begin airing in February 2019.

In 2015, she appeared in a guest spot on the ABC prime time soapy drama Mistresses. In April 2016, it was announced that Stause would be joining the cast of The Young and the Restless as Bethany Bryant, debuting in late May. She last appeared on August 17, 2016.

In 2017, she was cast in her first film leading role, in the thriller Eve of Abduction.

In addition to her acting career, Stause is also a real estate agent. Her work is showcased in Selling Sunset, a Netflix reality television show focused on The Oppenheim Group, a real estate brokerage dealing in luxury homes in L.A.

On September 2, 2020, Stause was announced as one of the celebrities competing on the 29th season of Dancing with the Stars. She was eliminated in the eighth week of competition, getting to eighth place.

Personal life 
Stause was engaged to Matthew Morrison from December 9, 2006, to 2007.

In January 2014, it was confirmed that Stause and Justin Hartley were dating and the couple announced their engagement in July 2016. They were married on October 28, 2017. In November 2019, Hartley filed for divorce, citing irreconcilable differences. Stause alleged that Hartley had let her know about the divorce by text only 45 minutes before the media broke the news. She filed for dissolution of marriage in December 2019 and refuted the July 8 separation date previously listed by Hartley. The divorce was finalized on February 22, 2021. She subsequently started dating Dancing with the Stars dancer Keo Motsepe from December 2020 to February 2021. Following their split, she announced via Instagram in July 2021 she had begun a romantic relationship with Selling Sunset co-star and boss Jason Oppenheim, which ended in December of the same year. In May 2022, Stause confirmed a relationship with Australian musician G Flip.

Both of Stause's parents died from lung cancer between 2019 and 2020.

Stause has four sisters. Her oldest sister, Shonda, made an appearance on seasons 1 and 3 of Selling Sunset and resides in St. Louis.

Filmography

Awards and nominations

References

External links 

 
 

1981 births
21st-century American actresses
Actresses from Kentucky
American real estate brokers
American soap opera actresses
American television actresses
Living people
Murray State University alumni
People from Marshall County, Kentucky
Bisexual actresses
LGBT people from Kentucky